Transilien is the brand name given to the commuter rail network serving Île-de-France, the region surrounding and including the city of Paris. The network consists of eight lines: H, J, K, L, N, U, P and R, each operated by SNCF, the state-owned railway of France. The lines begin and end in major Parisian stations, but unlike the RER network, the Transilien trains do not cross through the Paris city centre.

The Transilien brand was established on 20 September 1999 as a way to unify the suburban network that existed since the late nineteenth century. The name "Transilien" is a derivative of Francilien, the demonym for people living in Île-de-France. As part of the rebranding effort, stations and rolling stock were modernized.

The area covered does not correspond exactly with the boundaries of the Île-de-France region, with some lines crossing into other regions. On the other hand, some stations located at the margins of the Île-de-France region, are not served by Transilien routes, but instead TER trains from neighboring regions.

Transilien trains operate over tracks owned by SNCF Réseau (formerly RFF) and the same tracks are used by mainline passenger trains (TGV and Intercités), by other transport operators (Renfe, Deutsche Bahn, Eurostar, Thalys, and Venice-Simplon Orient Express) and by freight trains.

Although not strictly part of the network, the Transilien brand can also be seen on the RER C, D and E lines and tramway lines 4 and 11, which are operated by the same division of SNCF.

History

Appearance of first suburban trains 

The first line in the suburbs of Paris opened on August 26, 1837, between Paris' (Saint-Lazare station) and Saint-Germain (the line stops temporarily at Le Pecq). This line was handed over to the RATP on 1 October 1972, when RER A was commissioned. Its immediate success led to the creation of numerous lines, primarily intended to link the main cities of France. Suburban service has long been marginal for large companies, with the exception of the West, where several short lines crossing residential areas are seeing their local traffic increase sharply. The creation of workers subscriptions marked a sharp increase in traffic, and especially, at the beginning of the massive urbanization at Paris' periphery, with the phenomenon of migrant workers.

Influence of lines on urbanization around Paris 
The housing cost's increase as a result of major Haussmann works and the hygienic conditions inside Paris prompted workers and then employees working in the capital to live in the rural suburbs. The suburban trains allowed them and still allow them to rally their jobs inside the Île-de-France.

The successive topographic maps of the French IGN show the urbanization of the Parisian suburbs over the decades near the stations of the suburban lines. In the region, especially south of the capital, these lines follow the bottom of the valleys because the steam traction did not support the steep gradients: the urbanization of the trays takes place later with the advent of the automobile for the general public during the second half of the 20th century. The automobiles allowed people either to go directly to work, or to live at a distance from the station, where the land prices and rents are lower than in the immediate vicinity of the stations.

Geographers sometimes use pictured expressions to describe these two periods: the urbanization is done in "fingers of a glove" along the lines of suburban trains (the center of the glove being in Paris), then in a "spot of oil" with the car that allows to live a little further from the station.

Post-World War II 

In 1938, the new SNCF exploited the disparate lines and materials bequeathed by the big companies. If the West seems to be very favored, with its electrified lines and powerful self-propelled equipment, the remaining of the network was still very far from these standards. During the Second World War, the traffic was strongly disorganized and drastically limited. Bombings destroyed depots and parts of the rolling stock. The transport conditions were particularly tedious, and remained so for several years after the end of the conflict, a period when much had to be rebuilt. The bad memories of these difficult years, and the individual transports' multiplication reduced the traffic, with regression from 1946 to 1958, and an even worse situation between 1952 and 1958.

From 1959 to 1969, major electrification began the gradual modernization of the rail network, with the final disappearance of steam engines in the suburbs in 1970. The proliferation of automobile congestion, combined with the modernization of the network, led to the return of traffic. From 1969 to 2044, the creation of the RER caused a radical change in the image of rail transport. RER Line A experienced a spectacular increase in passengers, which leads to a saturation point in less than ten years.

On 1 September 1999, the first class was removed on all trains in the commuter network, as well as on the RER. At the time, it represented only 1% of travelers. First class had already been removed on the Paris metro in 1991.

Transilien label 

However, despite the numerous investments made over the past three decades, the suburban network suffered from a poor public image, but also from decision-makers and local authorities. While the RATP benefited from the image of the RER, which is generally associated with it, and an aura of modernity and innovation with a visible logo, the SNCF network reminded people of the suburb trains with a negative connotation of obsolete rolling stock, chronic delays, and unwelcoming train stations.

The national company then developed a minimum standard of development and renovation of stations and rolling stock, and a label to characterize it visibly to the general public. After searching for a name immediately identifying the suburban network, such as TER Île-de-France, Citélien, and even the generalization of the RER name, it is finally the name of Transilien, which is retained and becomes the new brand image of the business. The name is officially presented on September 20, 1999. In order to obtain the label, the stations must respect minimum criteria of comfort and modernization. However, it is difficult for SNCF to award itself a label, and the name quickly becomes a commercial brand, much like the TGV, the TER or Intercités. The modernization of equipment is much more expensive and is undertaken more gradually. The first train equipped with this label is the Z 6435/6 of the Z 6400 series.

Today

The Transilien is divided into six key entities, which are divided according to SNCF guidelines and are unrelated to the departmental boundaries. The lines are then divided into branches which, similarly to the RER, are given letters. However, until 2005, the letters were unknown to the wider travelling public.

The six Transilien entities are:
Transilien Paris-Est (Line P)
Transilien Paris-Nord (Lines H and K)
Transilien Paris-Saint-Lazare (Lines J and L)
Transilien Paris-La Défense (Line U)
Transilien Paris-Montparnasse (Line N)
Transilien Paris-Lyon (Line R)

The system is slightly complicated; each different entity has very different structures. Key complications include:

The power supplies
The number of branches
The lack of onward transportation beyond the termini 
Density of trains on the network
The mix of traffic on the railway, including express trains, freight trains, long-distance trains, Transilien trains and RER traffic.

The glitches in the network are visible at times when SNCF staff go on strike or serious technical problems occur on the network. Thousands of travellers arrive late for work or even, when there are serious problems, decide not to go into work, which causes a large financial burden to companies.

Because of the extent of the lines, a concentric zoning system is used. Trains that are bound for the outer zones are normally operated as express trains and are nonstop until reaching the outer zones to reduce travel time.

Rolling stock
The rolling stock used on the Transilien comes from a long evolution of the material in the suburbs. The following stock is used on the network:
 SNCF Class BB 27300
 Voiture de banlieue à 2 niveaux
 SNCF Class BB 17000 (all scrapped in 20 October 2020)
 SNCF Class Z 22500
 SNCF Class Z 50000

On 16 January 2002, during a ceremony at the Gare de l'Est, SNCF President Louis Gallois, regional prefect Jean-Pierre Duport and Île-de-France Regional Council President Jean-Paul Huchon presented the new liveries of Transilien.

The design used for the rehabilitation and rejuvenation of the fleet was conducted by two outside agencies under contracts awarded in October 2000. RCP Design Global provided exterior design and interior signage, and Avant Première the interior. All vehicles received a new blue and gray Transilien livery with panels of color to highlight doors and internal characteristics. Everything was treated with a graffiti- resistant coating to reduce the impact of vandalism. The trains are equipped with a new ergonomic design of seating, with individual seats instead of the traditional banks. They are covered with vandal-resistant fabric in blue, yellow and red. Circulation and inter-car doors have been modified to improve the distribution of passengers in trains

Entities

"Paris Montparnasse" lines
The trains on this line operate from Gare Montparnasse along the following routes:

Transilien N
Paris Montparnasse - Mantes-la-Jolie via Plaisir-Grignon 
Paris Montparnasse - Houdan - Dreux (first stop Versailles-Chantiers, then Plaisir-Grignon and then all stations to Dreux)
Paris Montparnasse - Rambouillet

"Paris Lyon" lines
The trains on this line operate from Gare de Lyon along the following routes:

Transilien R  
Paris Lyon - Montereau via Moret-Veneux-les-Sablons 
Paris Lyon - Souppes-Château-Landon - Montargis 
Melun - Montereau via Héricy

"Paris Nord" lines
The trains on this line operate from Gare du Nord along the following routes:

Transilien K 
Gare du Nord - Dammartin Juilly Saint-Mard - Crépy-en-Valois
Transilien H 
Gare du Nord - Luzarches 
Gare du Nord  - Persan-Beaumont via Montsoult-Maffliers (Eastern branch) or via Ermont-Eaubonne (Western Branch) 
Gare du Nord - Pontoise - Persan-Beaumont - Bruyères-sur-Oise - Creil

"Paris Est" lines
The trains on this line operate from Gare de l'Est along the following routes:

Transilien P North
Paris Est - Meaux 
Paris Est - Crouy-sur-Ourcq - La Ferté-Milon 
Paris Est - Nanteuil-Saâcy - Château-Thierry 
Paris Est - Esbly - Crécy-la-Chapelle
Transilien P South
Paris Est - Longueville - Provins 
Paris Est - Coulommiers 
Paris Est - La Ferté-Gaucher

"Paris Saint-Lazare" lines
The trains on this line operate from Gare Saint-Lazare along the following routes:

Transilien J North
Paris Saint-Lazare - Cormeilles-en-Parisis 
Paris Saint-Lazare - Pontoise 
Paris Saint-Lazare - Chars - Gisors 
Paris Saint-Lazare - Mantes-la-Jolie par Conflans
Transilien J South
Paris Saint-Lazare - Poissy - Mantes-la-Jolie 
Paris Saint-Lazare - Port-Villez - Vernon 
Paris Saint-Lazare - Bréval - Évreux (via Mantes-la Jolie)
Transilien L North 
Paris Saint-Lazare - Cergy-le-Haut
Transilien L South
Paris Saint-Lazare - Saint-Cloud 
Paris Saint-Lazare - Versailles Rive Droite
Paris Saint-Lazare - Saint-Nom-la-Bretèche
Saint-Germain-en-Laye - Grande ceinture - Noisy-le-Roi

"La Défense - La Verrière" line
The trains on this line operate from La Défense station along the following route:

Transilien U 
La Défense - La Verrière

See also
 List of Transilien stations
 Tangentielle Nord
 Grande Ceinture line

References

External links
 Official site, showing journey planner and timetables

 
Rail transport in Île-de-France
SNCF brands